Fusao (written:  or ) is a masculine Japanese given name. Notable people with the name include:

, pen name of Toshio Gotō, Japanese writer
, Japanese businessman and racehorse owner
, Japanese American poet

Japanese masculine given names